Pergola is a comune (municipality) in the Province of Pesaro e Urbino in the Italian region Marche.
The Gilt Bronzes of Cartoceto di Pergola were discovered in the communal territory in 1946. They are now exhibited in a museum at Pergola.

Main sights
Museo Bronzi Dorati, Pergola . It houses the Gilt Bronzes from Cartoceto di Pergola.
Church of Saint Andrea
Church of Saint Francesco
Church of Saint Giacomo
Church of Saint Maria di Piazza
Town hall
Chiesa dei Re Magi
Santa Maria della Tinte
 House of Alessandro Agosteo

References 

Cities and towns in the Marche